The Belize People's Front (BPF) is a Belizean progressive and social democratic centre-left political party founded in 2013. The BPF made its electoral debut in the 2020 Belizean general election on 11 November 2020, in which it fielded 13 candidates and became the third largest political party in the country. BPF's leader Nancy Marin is the first female political party leader in Belize.

Political Leader

Key:

    

PM: Prime Minister

LO: Leader of the Opposition

Electoral history

House of Representatives

References

External links 
 

Political parties in Belize
Political parties established in 2013
2013 establishments in Belize